Gangbei is a district of the city of Guigang, Guangxi, China.

County-level divisions of Guangxi
Guigang